Steven Jay Hughes (February 12, 1954 – February 18, 2000) was an American artist for the Chaos! Comics company.  Hughes provided the art for many of the company's comics, including Lady Death, Evil Ernie, and the short-lived superhero series Detonator . He also helped to create the signature look of these characters.

Biography 
Inspired by EC comics such as Tales from the Crypt, and especially EC artist Wally Wood, Hughes began as an artist for various titles from Aircel Comics.

Death 
Hughes died on February 18, 2000, in Scottsdale, Arizona, after a long battle with cancer.  Hughes was survived by his wife Barbara Hughes and his children Amber, Chance, and Samantha.

References 

1954 births
2000 deaths
American comics artists
African-American comics creators
American comics creators
20th-century African-American people